Pageant of Murder is a 1965 mystery detective novel by the British writer Gladys Mitchell. It is the thirty eighth in the long-running series of books featuring Mitchell's best known character, the psychoanalyst and amateur detective Mrs Bradley.

Synopsis
The small town of Brayne not too far from Windsor is to be granted borough status. To celebrate this an ambitious local councillor decides to stage a historical pageant. However the death of the actor playing Falstaff, killed by a knife wound, leads to the arrival of Mrs Bradley to investigate.

References

Bibliography
 Reilly, John M. Twentieth Century Crime & Mystery Writers. Springer, 2015.

1965 British novels
Novels by Gladys Mitchell
British crime novels
British mystery novels
British thriller novels
Novels set in England
British detective novels
Michael Joseph books